The 5.7 cm Maxim-Nordenfelt "Canon de caponnière" was a fortress gun and infantry gun developed during the 1880s in Britain which was sold to Belgium and later produced under license by the Cockerill company.  It saw action during World War I in both Belgian and German hands.

Design

Fortress gun 
In 1887 the Belgian War Ministry ordered 185 5.7 cm fortress guns to arm their fortresses including Namur and Liege.  The 5.7 cm Maxim-Nordenfelt was a short 26 caliber gun and not the longer 42-50 caliber QF 6-pounder Nordenfelt naval gun.  It was a typical built-up gun of the period made of steel with a vertical sliding-block breech and it fired fixed QF ammunition of a number of different styles.  The guns were mounted in Grusonwerke gun turrets or in armored casemates on central pivot mounts and used in an anti-personnel role.

Infantry gun 
In addition to its fortress gun role, it was deployed in an infantry gun role.  The guns were mounted on light two-wheeled box trail carriages without a recoil mechanism and protected by a three-sided gun shield.  During 1914 the Germans captured large numbers of these guns and used them in the infantry gun role mainly to engage enemy machine gun nests in support of infantry assaults.  In 1916 the Germans had 450 of these infantry guns in service.

Tank gun and anti-tank gun 
In addition to the infantry gun role, the Germans used a number of guns to arm their A7V tanks and the guns were mounted in an armored casemate at the front of the vehicle with limited traverse.  The Germans also mounted a number guns on central-pivot mounts on flatbed truck chassis to act as mobile anti-tank guns.

Belgian Forts

 Fort d'Andoy
 Fort de Barchon
 Fort de Boncelles
 Fort de Chaudfontaine
 Fort de Cognelée
 Fort de Dave
 Fort d'Embourg
 Fort d'Emines
 Fort d'Évegnée
 Fort de Flémalle
 Fort de Fléron
 Fort de Hollogne
 Fort de Lantin
 Fort de Liers
 Fort de Loncin
 Fort de Maizeret
 Fort de Malonne
 Fort de Marchovelette
 Fort de Pontisse
 Fort de Saint-Héribert
 Fort de Suarlée
 Fortified position of Liège
 Fortified position of Namur

Photo Gallery

References

External links
 Canon de 5.7 cm Maxim Nordenfelt M 1888

World War I artillery of Germany
Tank guns of Germany
Artillery of Belgium
57 mm artillery